The following is a list of post-punk bands. Post-punk is a musical movement that began at the end of the 1970s, following on the heels of the initial punk rock movement. The essential period that is most commonly cited as post-punk falls between 1978 and 1984.

0–9
23 Skidoo

A

Adam and the Ants
The Alarm
...And the Native Hipsters
The Art Attacks
Artery
Associates
Au Pairs
Aztec Camera

B

The B-52's
The Batfish Boys
Bauhaus
Bhopal Stiffs
Big Black
The Birthday Party
The Blackouts
Blam Blam Blam
Blue Orchids
Blyth Power
Buerak
Bush Tetras

C

Cabaret Voltaire
Capital Inicial
Cardiacs
A Certain Ratio
The Chameleons
James Chance and the Contortions
The Chills
Circus Mort
The Clash 
The Clean
Clock DVA
Cocteau Twins
The Comsat Angels
The Cult
The Cure

D

DA!
Dalek I Love You
Damien Done
Dead Can Dance
The Deep Freeze Mice
The Del-Byzanteens
Delta 5
Depeche Mode
Desperate Bicycles
Deutsch Amerikanische Freundschaft (D.A.F.)
Devo
Dinosaur Jr.
Do-Re-Mi
The Dream Syndicate
The Durutti Column

E

Echo & the Bunnymen
ESG
Essential Logic
Eurogliders
The Ex
Eyeless in Gaza

F

Factrix
Faith No More (as Faith No Man)
The Fall
Family Fodder
The Feelies
Felt
The Fire Engines
Flipper
The Flying Lizards
For Against
Fra Lippo Lippi (early work)

G

Gang of Four
Gene Loves Jezebel
Girls at Our Best!
Glaxo Babies
Green River
The Gun Club

H

Half Man Half Biscuit
Heaven 17
The Higsons
The Human League
Hüsker Dü

I

I'm So Hollow
In Camera

J

The Jam
Japan
The Jesus Lizard
The Jesus and Mary Chain
Josef K
Joy Division

K

Killing Joke
Kino

L

Laughing Clowns
LiLiPUT
The Lords of the New Church
Love and Rockets
Lowlife
Ludus

M

Molchat Doma
Magazine
Maximum Joy
Meat Puppets
The Mekons
Melvins
The Membranes
The Method Actors
Midnight Oil (early work)
Minimal Compact
Minny Pops
Mission of Burma
Mo-dettes
Models
Modern English
Modern Eon
The Monochrome Set

N

Naked Raygun
The Names
New Model Army
New Order
Nick Cave and the Bad Seeds
The Nightingales

O

The Opposition
Orange Juice

P

Palais Schaumburg
The Passage
The Passions
Pel Mel
Pere Ubu
Phantom Tollbooth
Pigbag
Pink Military
Ploho
The Pogues
The Police
The Pop Group
Primitive Calculators
The Proclaimers
The Psychedelic Furs
Public Image Ltd
Pylon

R

The Raincoats
Rank and File
Red Lorry Yellow Lorry
Rema-Rema
R.E.M.
The Residents
Rip Rig + Panic
Romeo Void

S

Sad Lovers & Giants
Savage Republic
The Scientists
Scratch Acid
Scritti Politti
Section 25
Sex Gang Children
Sielun Veljet
Simple Minds
Siouxsie and the Banshees
The Sisters of Mercy
The Sleepers
The Slits
The Smiths
The Soft Boys
The Sound
Southern Death Cult
Squeeze
Subway Sect
Sunnyboys
Swell Maps

T

Talking Heads
The Teardrop Explodes
Television
Television Personalities
The The
Theatre of Hate
This Heat
Thompson Twins (early work)
The Three Johns
Throbbing Gristle
Tin Huey
Tones on Tail
Transvision Vamp
Tuxedomoon

U

U2
UK Decay
Ultravox

V

The Veils
Violent Femmes
Voigt/465
Volcano Suns

W

The Wake
Wall of Voodoo
The Wedding Present
Whirlywirld
Wire

X

Xero
XTC

Y
Young Marble Giants

Z
Zounds

Post-punk revival bands

See also
List of gothic rock artists
List of new wave artists and bands
List of punk rock bands, 0–K
List of punk rock bands, L–Z
List of post-hardcore bands

References

Bibliography

 
Post-punk
Post punk